Susan Carroll may refer to:

Susan Carroll (author), American writer of romance novels
Sue Carroll (1953–2011), English journalist
Susan J. Carroll, American political scientist and women's studies professor